The Langley Schools Music Project is a collection of recordings of children's choruses singing pop hits by the likes of the Beach Boys, Paul McCartney, and David Bowie. Originally recorded in 1976–77, they were found and rereleased only 25 years later (in 2001) and became a cult hit and a successful example of outsider music.  It was rereleased on vinyl March 9, 2018, by Bar/None Records.

History
The project was undertaken in 1976–77 by Canadian music teacher Hans Fenger with students from four different elementary schools of the Langley School District in British Columbia. Recordings were made in a school gym in Langley, in Metro Vancouver. Two LPs were released, 1976's Lochiel, Glenwood, and South Carvolth Schools and 1977's Hans Fenger/Wix-Brown Elementary School.

Fenger later said:
I knew virtually nothing about conventional music education, and didn't know how to teach singing. Above all, I knew nothing of what children's music was supposed to be. But the kids had a grasp of what they liked: emotion, drama, and making music as a group. Whether the results were good, bad, in tune or out was no big deal -- they had élan. This was not the way music was traditionally taught. But then I never liked conventional 'children's music,' which is condescending and ignores the reality of children's lives, which can be dark and scary. These children hated 'cute.' They cherished songs that evoked loneliness and sadness

The recordings were little known until Brian Linds, a Victoria record collector, found the first record in a thrift store in 2000. He sent it to Irwin Chusid, a proponent of outsider music. After ten labels had rejected them, Bar/None Records released Innocence & Despair, a single-CD compilation of the two LPs.

Response
Innocence & Despair quickly created an international buzz, making many end-of-the-year best album lists in 2001.

Fred Schneider (B-52s) called the project "a haunting, evocative wall-of-sound experience that is affecting in an incredibly visceral way". Neil Gaiman commented, "I wish every school taught music like this. I wish every piece of music recorded in a school gymnasium were this haunting... and then I suspect that, if I listened to them right, maybe they would be."

Richard Carpenter described the vocals on "Calling Occupants" as "charming". David Bowie said the version of "Space Oddity" was "a piece of art that I couldn't have conceived of", describing the vocals as "earnest if lugubrious" and the backing arrangement as "astounding".

Salon music critic Steven Hyden wrote: "[T]he gloomy title [Innocence and Despair] is no lie: The echoing, yelping renditions of this feel-good music gives off a powerfully aching melancholy. It’s the sound of youth, frozen on tape, as it fades inexorably away."

Influence
VH-1 coordinated a reunion of Fenger and dozens of his former students in 2002, and produced a documentary about the project. Screenwriter Mike White's concept for the 2003 hit film School of Rock was inspired by the Langley CD. When Spike Jonze approached Karen O to write the soundtrack to Where The Wild Things Are, he gave Innocence and Despair as an example of the desired "simple melodies that were emotionally complex—something that both kids and adults would appreciate".

Use in film and television
In 2010, the Langley School recording of "Good Vibrations" was licensed for the soundtrack of the film Catfish. It can also be heard in the film's trailer.

The song "Calling Occupants of Interplanetary Craft" was used to close the film Arabian Nights, Volume 3.

The song "Space Oddity" was used in the closing of the film Wonderstruck.

The song "Rhiannon" was used in the closing credits of the HBO series Here and Now.

The song "In My Room" was used in the episode "Au Jus" of the third season of NBC's Good Girls.

Track listing

Lochiel, Glenwood, and South Carvolth Schools
Recorded and released 1976
 You're So Good to Me (originally by The Beach Boys)
 To Know Him Is To Love Him (The Teddy Bears)
 Help Me, Rhonda (The Beach Boys)
 Space Oddity (David Bowie)
 I'm Into Something Good (Herman's Hermits)
 Band on the Run (Paul McCartney & Wings)
 Rhiannon (Fleetwood Mac)
 Little Deuce Coupe (The Beach Boys)
 Saturday Night (Bay City Rollers)

Hans Fenger/Wix-Brown Elementary School
Recorded and released 1977
 Venus and Mars/Rock Show (originally by Paul McCartney & Wings)
 You're Sixteen (Johnny Burnette)
 Wildfire (Michael Martin Murphey)
 In My Room (The Beach Boys)
 I Get Around (The Beach Boys)
 The Long and Winding Road  (The Beatles)
 Desperado (The Eagles)
 Good Vibrations (The Beach Boys)
 God Only Knows (The Beach Boys)
 Sweet Caroline (Neil Diamond)
 Mandy (Barry Manilow)
 Calling Occupants of Interplanetary Craft (Klaatu)

Innocence & Despair
Compilation of the two previous albums, released 2001 in North America by Bar/None Records and in Europe by Basta Records.
Venus and Mars/Rock Show
Good Vibrations
God Only Knows
Space Oddity
The Long and Winding Road
Band on the Run
I'm Into Something Good
In My Room
Saturday Night
I Get Around
Mandy
Help Me, Rhonda
Desperado
You're So Good To Me
Sweet Caroline
To Know Him Is To Love Him
Rhiannon
You're Sixteen (Basta Records release only)
Little Deuce Coupe (Basta Records release only)
Wildfire
Calling Occupants of Interplanetary Craft

See also
PS22 chorus

References

External links
 The Langley Schools Music Project Bar-None Records
 The Langley Schools Music Project at Songs in the Key of Z (outsider music site)

Langley, British Columbia (district municipality)
2001 live albums
Outsider music albums